In the 1872 cricket season, the first experiment in pitch covering was carried out. Prince's Cricket Ground opened in Chelsea, London.

Playing record (by county)

Leading batsmen (qualification 15 innings)

Leading bowlers (qualification 800 balls)

Events 
 An experiment took place at Lord's to study the effects of covering the pitch before the start of a match, the first time this is known to have been tried. Unlike the recently introduced heavy roller which became universally used by 1880 and produced significant changes in the game by eliminating previously ubiquitous shooters, covering was for a long time severely rejected in England: it was the wet summer of 1924 before covering as regular practice was even considered and 1959 before it was considered "acceptable".
 14 May: MCC lose seven wickets before their first run is scored on a sticky wicket at Lord's against James Southerton and William Marten of Surrey. Their ninth wicket falls at 8 - which would have been the lowest score in an important match for sixty-two years - but the last wicket doubles the score
 Prince's Cricket Ground hosted its first first-class match being between North and South on 16 May. Before being built on, it was generally praised for its wickets and the scenery surrounding the ground.

Notes 
Nottinghamshire and Yorkshire played a third match at the short-lived Prince's Cricket Ground, Chelsea
Hampshire, though regarded until 1885 as first-class, played no inter-county matches between 1868 and 1869 or 1871 and 1874

References

Bibliography 
 John Lillywhite’s Cricketer's Companion (Green Lilly), Lillywhite, 1873
 James Lillywhite’s Cricketers' Annual (Red Lilly), Lillywhite, 1873
 John Wisden's Cricketers' Almanack, 1873

1872 in English cricket
English cricket seasons in the 19th century